Business Employment Services Training (BEST) is a welfare-to-work company in the United Kingdom. BEST is one of several companies that has a contract with the British government as part of the Work Programme - a workfare programme whereby unemployed individuals must work for their unemployment benefits.

They also perform tasks previously undertaken by Jobcentre/Jobcetre Plus offices.  For example, they will have unemployed individuals attend regular appointments with an 'Advisor', who will check what they have been doing to find work.

For many years BEST had contracts under the New Deal scheme, which was the Labour Government's scheme replaced by the Conservative's Work Programme.

Takeover 
In 2012 BEST was bought by Interserve and is now called Interserve Working Futures.

References

Workfare in the United Kingdom
1982 establishments in the United Kingdom
Mass media companies